Trichodezia kindermanni is a moth in the family Geometridae. It is found in the Russian Far East, China and Japan.

Subspecies
Trichodezia kindermanni kindermanni
Trichodezia kindermanni latifasciaria Matsumura, 1925 (Japan)
Trichodezia kindermanni leechi Inoue, 1946 (Russian Far East, Kuriles)
Trichodezia kindermanni leucocratia Prout, 1937 (China)
Trichodezia kindermanni mirabilis Bryk, 1942 (Kunashir Island)

References

Moths described in 1864
Cidariini
Moths of Japan